, 7% of new cars sold in Brazil were electric.

Government policy
, the Brazilian government does not charge any import taxes on electric vehicles.

Charging stations
, there were 1,300 public charging stations in Brazil.

Public opinion
In a 2022 survey conducted by Tupinambá Energia, 58% of prospective car buyers were interested in buying an electric vehicle.

By state

Goiás
, there were 27 public charging stations in Goiás.

, there were 19 public charging stations in Goiânia.

Rio de Janeiro
, there were about 3,000 electric vehicles in the state of Rio de Janeiro.

, there were about 2,000 electric vehicles in the city of Rio de Janeiro.

São Paulo
, there were 445 public charging stations in the city of São Paulo.

References

Brazil
Road transport in Brazil